Kim Bo-yeon (born Kim Bok-soon on December 31, 1957) is a South Korean actress.

Career
Kim Bo-yeon graduated from Anyang High School of Arts, and on the principal's recommendation, she was cast in her acting debut, the film A Season of Blooming Love in 1974, followed by the television drama 제3교실 in 1975. As a supporting actress in 1976's "Really Really" series (Never Forget Me, I Am Really Sorry), she and costars Im Ye-jin and Lee Deok-hwa emerged as popular teen stars of the 1970s. Kim further rose to stardom in her role of a high school girl with a brain tumor in Kim Soo-hyun's drama You in 1977.

After You ended in 1978, a record company signed Kim, and she eventually released four albums and one Christmas album. Her single "Love is the Flower of Life" won the Gold Prize at the 1983 Seoul International Song Festival. In 1982, she won Best Actress at the prestigious Grand Bell Awards for her performance in Bae Chang-ho's film People of Kkobang Neighborhood.

Plagued by rumors that she was romantically involved with Hyundai founder Chung Ju-young (which she denied), Kim left the entertainment industry temporarily in 1984 to study in the United States. She majored in Stage Design at Tusculum College in Tennessee.

Kim returned to Korea and resumed acting in 1987. In the following years, she received good reviews and acting recognition from the Chunsa Film Art Awards and Blue Dragon Film Awards for her roles in Silver Stallion (1991), Road to the Racetrack (1991), and A Hot Roof (1995). Though in recent years she's become more active in television, in 2009 Kim won Best Supporting Actress at the Buil Film Awards for playing a religion-obsessed mother in horror film Possessed.

Born as Kim Bok-soon, she officially changed her real name to Kim Yoon-joo in 2007.

Personal life
Kim married in 1988, and had two daughters, Kim Eun-seo and Kim Eun-jo. She and her husband later divorced.

She met actor Jeon No-min on the set of TV series A Saint and a Witch in 2003, and they married a year later. It was the second marriage for both. The relationship was considered controversial at the time because of their nine-year age difference. The couple began a makgeolli business named Family's Honor in 2008, but after it failed, the resulting financial strain caused the couple to divorce in 2012.

Filmography

Film

 Casa Amor: Exclusive for Ladies (2015)
 My PS Partner (2012)
 Moby Dick (2011)
 Sunny (2011) (cameo)
 In Love and War (2011) (cameo)
 Yogurt Lady (short film, 2010)
 Blades of Blood (2010) (cameo)
 Possessed (2009).
 Holy Daddy (2006)
 Duelist (2005)
 Temptation of Wolves (2004)
 He Was Cool  (2004)
 Low Life (2004)
 Drama Inside of a Skirt (1997)
 A Hot Roof (1995)
 Declaration of Genius (1995)
 My Dear Keum-hong (1995)
 The Young Man (1994)
 A Heavy Bird (1994)
 Pro at Love, Amateur at Marriage (1994)
 Road to the Racetrack (1991) 
 Silver Stallion (1991)
 My Love, My Bride (1990) 
 Mayumi (1990)
 The World of Women (1988)
 A Forest Where a Woman Breathes (1988)
 Hello, God (1987)
 Wild Scoundrels of College (1983)
 Madam Oh's Day Out (1983)
 People of Kkobang Neighborhood aka People in the Slums (1982)
 A Fine, Windy Day (1980)
 Run, Balloon! aka College Festival (1980)
 Earth Tremors (1980)
 A Woman's Pain (1980)
 Butterfly Amongst Flowers (1979)
 The Woman on the Ferris Wheel (1979)
 The Daughter-in-law Born in the Year of the Horse aka A Stubborn Daughter-in-law (1979)
 A Girl Named Jegal Maeng-sun aka Country Girl (1978)
 Our High School Days (1978)
 Prankster of Girl's High School aka Tomboys of School (1977) 
 Season of Love (1977)
 I Am Really Sorry (1976)
 Mother and Son (1976)
 Never Forget Me (1976)
 A Season of Blooming Love (1974)

Television series

 Jinxed at First (2022) - Eun Ok-jin 
 Love (ft. Marriage and Divorce) (2021) - Season 1–2
 Once Again (2020)
 A Piece of Your Mind (2020)
 Misty (2018) 
 You Are Too Much (2017)
 Shopaholic Louis (2016)
 Monster (2016)
 The Eccentric Daughter-in-Law (2015)
 The Invincible Lady Cha (2015)
 Pretty Man (KBS2, 2013)
 Princess Aurora (2013) 
 A Hundred Year Legacy (2013) (cameo)
 Childless Comfort (2013) (cameo)
 The King of Dramas (2012) (cameo)
 Feast of the Gods (2012) 
 Dangerous Woman (2011–2012)
 Iron Daughters-in-Law (2011) 
 New Tales of Gisaeng (2011)
 Golden Fish (2010)
 Again, My Love (2009) (cameo)
 Amnok River Flows (2008)
 Love Marriage (2008)
 Golden Era of Daughters-in-law (2007–2008)
 Ahyeong-dong Madam (2007–2008)
 Snow Flower (2006–2007)
 Hwang Jini (2006)
 How Much Love (2006)
 Smile Again (2006)
 Precious Family (2004)
 Island Village Teacher (2004)
 Thousand Years of Love (2003)
 A Saint and a Witch (2003)
 Soon-deok-yi (2003)
 Ice Flower (2002–2003)
 Wonderful Days (2001–2002)
 Way of Living: Couple (2001–2002)
 재동이 (1997)
 Mom's Out of Town (1996)
 The Bicycle Riding Woman (1996)
 The Reason I Won't Divorce (1996)
 The Brothers' River (1996–1997)
 The Fourth Republic (1995)
 Two Dads (1995)
 노래만들기 (1995)
 Adam's City (1994)
 Big Sister (1994)
 Two Women (1992)
 Two Sisters (1992)
 Small City (1992)
 Country of Water (1991)
 Magpie-in-law (1991)
 어둔 하늘 어둔 새 (1990)
 꽃 피고 새 울면 (1990)
 Blazing River (1989)
 다녀왔읍니다 (1983)
 거부실록 – 무역왕 최봉준 (1983)
 나라야 (1982)
 여인열전 – 서궁마마 (1982)
 Sword and Dew (1981)
 Portrait of the Days of Youth (1980)
 Last Stop (1980)
 Like Mom and Dad (1979)
 Wife of One's Youngest Son (1978)
 You (1977)
 Wild Rose (1976)
 제3교실 (1975)

Variety show
See You at 9  (1981)

Radio program
9595 Show

Theater
As You Like It (1980)

Discography
Kim Bo-yeon '82 (4th album, 1982)
Golden 3 (3rd album, 1980)
Golden Hits (2nd album, 1979)
Carol Song Special (1979)
Kim Bo-yeon's Golden Album (1st album, 1978)

Awards
2013 MBC Drama Awards: Golden Acting Award, Actress (Princess Aurora)
2010 MBC Drama Awards: Golden Acting Award, Actress in a Serial Drama (Golden Fish)
2009 32nd Golden Cinematography Awards: Most Popular Actress (Possessed)
2009 18th Buil Film Awards: Best Supporting Actress (Possessed)
1995 6th Chunsa Film Art Awards: Best Supporting Actress (A Hot Roof)
1992 3rd Chunsa Film Art Awards: Best Supporting Actress (Road to the Racetrack)
1991 12th Blue Dragon Film Awards: Best Supporting Actress (Silver Stallion)
1991 2nd Chunsa Film Art Awards: Best Supporting Actress (Silver Stallion)
1983 6th Seoul International Song Festival: Gold Prize (Love is the Flower of Life)
1982 21st Grand Bell Awards: Best Actress (People of Kkobang Neighborhood)
1978 17th Grand Bell Awards: Best New Actress (A Girl Named Jegal Maeng-sun)
1978 14th Baeksang Arts Awards: Best New Actress, TV category (You)
1977 MBC Drama Awards: Best New Actress (You)

References

External links
 
 
 

Living people
1957 births
Actresses from Seoul
South Korean television actresses
South Korean film actresses
South Korean stage actresses
South Korean voice actresses
20th-century South Korean actresses
21st-century South Korean actresses
South Korean Buddhists